De Witt is a surname of Dutch origin meaning "the white". In America, the name is usually concatenated to DeWitt. Notable people with the surname include:

De Witt (family), a patrician family from the Dutch Golden Age
Andries de Witt (1573–1637), Grand Pensionary of Holland
Jacob de Witt (1589–1674), burgomaster of Dordrecht 
Cornelis de Witt (1623–1672), Dutch politician, brother of Johan 
Johan de Witt (1625–1672), Grand Pensionary of Holland
Johan de Witt Jr. (1662–1701), Dutch bibliophile and politician, son of Johan 

Alexander De Witt (1798–1879), American politician
 (1824–1909), French politician
 (1828–1889), French politician
David M. De Witt (1837–1912), American politician
Elmo De Witt (died 2011), South African filmmaker
Francis B. De Witt (1849–1929), American politician
Henriette Guizot de Witt (1829–1908), French writer 
Jacob De Witt (1785–1859), Canadian politician
Jacob H. De Witt (1784–1867), American politician
Marguerite de Witt (1853–1924), French activist, daughter of Conrad and Henriette
Pauline de Witt (1831–1874), French historian
Simeon De Witt (1756–1834), American cartographer

See also
DeWitt (name)
De Wit
De Witte (disambiguation)
Witte de With (1599–1658), Dutch naval officer

Dutch-language surnames